Liparis bikunin is a fish from the genus Liparis. A marine fish, it lives in the Northwest Pacific Ocean by Kushiro, Japan. It is also considered a demersal fish.

References

Liparis (fish)
Taxa named by Kiyomatsu Matsubara
Fish described in 1954